This is a list of prime ministers of Djibouti. Since the establishment of the office of prime minister in 1977, there have been 6 official prime ministers. The current prime minister is Abdoulkader Kamil Mohamed, since 1 April 2013.

The list also includes presidents of the Government Council of French Territory of the Afars and the Issas, which acted as heads of government of the area of present-day Djibouti between 1967 and 1977, before the proclamation of independence.

List of officeholders

See also
Djibouti
List of presidents of Djibouti
French Territory of the Afars and the Issas (FTAI)
French Somaliland
List of governors of French Somaliland
Lists of office-holders

References

External links
World Statesmen – Djibouti

Djibouti
 
Djibouti politics-related lists